"Chahat Kay Safar Mein" is a song from the 2001 Indian soap opera, Kasautii Zindagii Kay. The song is composed by Dinesh Chaturvedi and sung by Babul Supriyo along with Priya Bhattacharya. The lyrics were penned by Nawab Arzoo. The song features Shweta Tiwari and Cezanne Khan in the video. Babul Supriyo received many accolades for his honey-soaked rendition of the song.

Development
Babul Supriyo recorded the whole song in multiple takes and received much appreciation from the established TV personalities involved in the project.

Picturization
The song is picturized on Prerna Sharma (Shweta Tiwari) and Anurag Basu (Cezanne Khan). The song picturises the romance and the strong relation between the two characters and their love and sacrifices for each other through their lives.

Remake

Remake of the song was released at July 21, 2018 for the rebooted version of the soap Kasautii Zindagii Kay where the song was reduced to 0:40 seconds.

Reception
"Chahat Kay Safar Mein" was an instant success and topped the charts. Babul Supriyo became the first and till date is the only singer to win both Indian Telly Award and Indian Television Academy Awards for his song.  

In the promo Ekta Kapoor said,.

References

Hindi songs
2001 songs